Barbilophozia is a liverwort genus in the family Anastrophyllaceae.

Species
 Barbilophozia atlantica (Kaal.) K. Mull., the Atlantic barbilophozia   
 Barbilophozia attenuata (Mart.) Loeske, the attenuate barbilophozia   
 Barbilophozia barbata (Schmid. ex Schreb.) Loeske, the barbilophozia   
 Barbilophozia binsteadii (Kaal.) Loeske, the Binstead's barbilophozia   
 Barbilophozia cavifolia (Buch & S. Arnell) R. Stotl. & B. Stotl., the barbilophozia   
 Barbilophozia floerkei (Web. & Mohr) Loeske, the Floerke's barbilophozia   
 Barbilophozia gracilis K. Müll., the barbilophozia
 Barbilophozia hatcheri (Evans) Loeske, the Hatcher's barbilophozia   
 Barbilophozia hyperborea (Schust.) R. Stotl. & B. Stotl., the barbilophozia   
 Barbilophozia kunzeana (Hub.) Gams, the Kunze's barbilophozia   
 Barbilophozia lycopodioides (Wallr.) Loeske, the barbilophozia   
 Barbilophozia quadriloba (Lindb.) Loeske, the fourlobe barbilophozia
 Barbilophozia rubescens (Schust. & Damsholt) Kart. &  Söder., the barbilophozia

References

External links

 Barbilophozia on www.itis.gov

Jungermanniales
Jungermanniales genera